The Meadowlands Racetrack (currently referred to as Meadowlands Racing & Entertainment) is a horse racing track at the Meadowlands Sports Complex in East Rutherford, New Jersey, United States. The track hosts both thoroughbred racing and harness racing. It is known popularly in the region as "The Big M". Meadowlands has year-round horse racing as well as a number of bars and restaurants.

History

Opened in the mid-1970s, Meadowlands Racetrack held its first-ever harness race on September 1, 1976, while thoroughbred racing commenced on September 6, 1977. With the exception of the opening season of 1976, autumn has been dedicated to the thoroughbreds, while the rest of the year features standardbreds, or harness horses.

The advertising campaign that accompanied the start of thoroughbred racing at the Meadowlands in 1977 was noted for its use of the slogan "Racing with the Moon", originally popularized in 1941 by bandleader Vaughn Monroe (alluding to the fact that post-time is in the evening – a circumstance that still pertains, although afternoon programs during long holiday weekends are occasionally put on). More recent advertising campaigns have included a direct and catchy approach to attending live racing: "It's All About Being Here – The Meadowlands!"

With its sweeping curves and wide stretches, the "Big M" has been known for exceptional times for harness racing.  Opening night at the track featured the fastest harness mile run in New Jersey to that time, 1:55 by Rambling Willie.  The world record for a mile by a standardbred, 1:46 by Lather Up, driven by Montrell Teague in the 2019 Graduate, matched Always B Miki's time at the Red Mile in Lexington.

The Meadowlands Racetrack has been the site of the Hambletonian, the first leg of the Trotting Triple Crown, since 1981. It has also been home to the Cane Pace, the first leg of Harness Racing's Pacing Triple Crown since 2015 with the Cane run on the same program as the Hambletonian.

Leading drivers in recent seasons have included Ron Pierce, Brian Sears, George Brennan, and Tim Tetrick.

The track is operated by New Meadowlands Racetrack LLC with Jeff Gural as its CEO and chairman. Gural took over operations of the Meadowlands in December 2011.

Ken Warkentin is the current race caller and announcer for the standardbred Meadowlands meets. Chris Griffin currently calls the thoroughbred meet. Sam McKee was also the track announcer until he suffered a stroke days after calling what no one knew at the time would be the last card he ever would call on January 21, 2017, and passing away on March 7, 2017.  Veteran sportscaster Dave Johnson, was the track's lead public-address announcer from its opening until the early 2000s.

In July 2009, the Meadowlands Rail Line opened for event service, but is expected to run daily upon completion of the nearby American Dream Meadowlands.

Bruton Smith, owner of Lowe's Motor Speedway and other motorsports racetracks, has long had his sights on Meadowlands Racetrack for possible conversion into a short track venue for NASCAR events in the New York City area. His most recent of several attempts to purchase the track failed in the late 1990s. A report issued in January 2010 by New Jersey Governor Chris Christie discussed the idea of closing the Meadowlands Racetrack and selling it for commercial development or converting it into a NASCAR facility. Governor Christie has considered selling or leasing the racetrack to a private operator or closing it altogether.

The New Jersey Sports and Exposition Authority privatized the racetrack, to Jeffrey Gural of Newmark Knight Frank in December 2011. The privatization included $110 million of improvements consisting of a new 2,250-seat grandstand built on the site of the former backstretch. The existing grandstand was used as an event space for Super Bowl XLVIII.

The old Meadowlands grandstand closed for racing on November 2, 2013. The new grandstand, which cost $110 million to build and can seat 2,200, opened for racing on November 23, 2013, with an estimated crowd of 15,000 in attendance. Demolition of the old Meadowlands grandstand occurred in 2022 after hosting the New Jersey Sports and Exposition Authority (NJSEA) Information technology (IT) hub and New Jersey State Police infrastructure for several years.

The Meadowlands was announced to host the championship final for the 2018 AMA Pro American Flat Track Championship motorcycle racing series, scheduled for October 6.  The event, to be designated as the Meadowlands Mile, joins Turf Paradise, The Red Mile, Remington Park, and Canterbury Park as horse racing tracks that will run the series in 2018.

In June 2018, Paddy Power Betfair announced that it had partnered with Meadowlands to open a sportsbook at the track, following the state's legalization of sports betting (as facilitated by the result of Murphy v. National Collegiate Athletic Association). The sportsbook opened on July 14, 2018, under the branding of FanDuel, a daily fantasy sports service recently acquired by the company.

Physical attributes

With a span of exactly  from the top of the stretch to the finish line and a distance of exactly  from the finish line to the beginning of the first (clubhouse) turn, the dimensions of the track are considered "typical" or "standard" for an American racetrack. The track is equipped to race at night and most of its races are at night.

In the middle of the track is a lake, intended to resemble the state of New Jersey.

The old grandstand, horse barns and site, was designed by the Philadelphia architectural firm of EwingCole (now known as Ewing Cole Cherry Brott), who also designed a number of other track facilities around the world as well as Citizens Bank Park in Philadelphia (with Populous).

The new grandstand opened for simulcasting on Monday, November 18, 2013.  The official unveiling of the new grandstand was on November 23, 2013, for first night of live fall harness racing.  The collaborative production by managing partner Jeff Gural and The Hard Rock spans 180,000 square feet across four floors and includes a track apron that holds up to 10,000 people. Notable drivers in attendance included John Campbell, Yannick Gingras, Scott Zeron and Tim Tetrick.  Famed pacer Gallo Blue Chip kicked off the racing action with a ribbon cutting ceremony across the finish line.

Accessibility and transportation
Like the rest of the sports complex, Meadowlands Racetrack is accessible via Exit 16W on the western spur of the New Jersey Turnpike (I-95) which is located adjacent to NJ Route 3 and NJ Route 120. NJ Transit provides bus service on the 160 from the Port Authority Bus Terminal and the 703 on the Haledon/Paterson/East Rutherford route. NJ Transit also provides rail service on the Meadowlands Rail Line at the Meadowlands station.

Racing
Up until the 1990s, The Meadowlands held these thoroughbred stakes races, some of which were moved to Monmouth Park:
 Grade III – Meadowlands Cup	
 Grade III – Cliff Hanger Stakes	
 Grade III – Pegasus Stakes		
 Grade III – Violet Handicap
 former Grade III – Morven Stakes

From November until the first Saturday of August, in addition to the Hambletonian and Meadowlands Pace, the Meadowlands Racetrack also hosts a variety of other stakes races for standardbreds:

 Super Bowl (discontinued)
 Escort (discontinued)
 Worldly Beauty (discontinued)
 Charles Singer Memorial (discontinued)
 Burning Point (discontinued)
 Sonsam (discontinued)
 William "Buddy" Gilmour (discontinued)
 Shiaway St. Pat (discontinued)
 Clyde Hirt Stakes (discontinued)
 Reynolds Series
 Simpson Series 
 Giant Victory (discontinued)
 Artistic Vision (discontinued)
 Whata Baron (discontinued)
 New Jersey Sire Series
 Graduate Pace & Trot 

 Miss Versatility
 Golden Girls
 Del Miller Memorial Trot
 Mistletoe Shalee
 Stanley Dancer Memorial
 William R. Haughton Memorial
 Miss New Jersey
 New Jersey Classic 
 Ima Lula (discontinued)
 Duenna
 Townsend Ackerman
 Shady Daisy
 Fresh Yankee
 Lady Liberty
 U.S. Pacing Championship
 John Cashman Jr. Memorial

 Jim Doherty Memorial (formerly known as Merrie Annabelle)
 Peter Haughton Memorial
 Cane Pace
 Hambletonian Oaks
 Continental Victory (discontinued)
 TVG Free For All Series
 Tarpot Hap
 The Three Diamonds
 The Goldsmith Maid
 The Valley Victory
 The Governor's Cup

See also

 Gambling in New Jersey

References

External links
 The Meadowlands Racetrack
 New Jersey Horse Enthusiast Web
 The Meadowlands Racetrack on Facebook
 The Meadowlands Racetrack on Twitter
 

 
East Rutherford, New Jersey
Horse racing venues in New Jersey
Harness racing venues in the United States
Gambling in New Jersey
Sports venues in Bergen County, New Jersey
Tourist attractions in Bergen County, New Jersey
1976 establishments in New Jersey
Sports venues completed in 1976
Cross country running venues